Events from the year 1455 in France

Incumbents
 Monarch – Charles VII

Deaths
 28 October - Guillaume-Hugues d'Estaing, cardinal

References

1450s in France